Bombus centralis, the central bumblebee, is a species of bumble bee found in parts of Canada and the western United States. The species was first described by Ezra Townsend Cresson in 1864.

Description 
Bombus centralis is a small bumblebee with a long face and proboscis and light brown wings. The colouration of the thorax and anterior part of the abdomen is yellow, while terga (abdominal segments) 3 and 4 (for the females) and 3 to 5 (males) are orange-red. The tail is black; overall the hair is long. Across the thorax is a black, medially located band.

Distribution 
The species is distributed from British Columbia and Alberta in Canada to California, Arizona and New Mexico in the United States.

Ecology 
The bumblebee lives in prairies or river valleys. The hibernating queens appear in late May and start building a nest, often in disused rodent nests. About a month later, the first workers emerge. The nest declines in September, and all the bees, except the new queens, die. The bees forage on various plant taxa, such as wild onions, rabbitbrush, thistles, goldenbushes, coyote mints, penstemons, and phacelias.

References 

Bumblebees
Insects described in 1864
Hymenoptera of North America
Taxa named by Ezra Townsend Cresson